Empty Words is a 1979 book by John Cage.

Empty Words may also refer to:

Songs
 "Empty Words", by Blackmore's Night from Secret Voyage
 "Empty Words", by Bowery Electric from Beat
 "Empty Words", by Breed 77 from In My Blood (En Mi Sangre)
 "Empty Words", by Christina Aguilera from Lotus
 "Empty Words", by Death from Symbolic
 "Empty Words", by The Groop
 "Empty Words", by Quasi from Field Studies
 "Empty Words", by Rich Kids

Other uses
 Empty Words, the official website of Death founder Chuck Schuldiner
 Empty Words, a 2000s series of graphic novels by Benjamin Rivers
 Empty words, a class of words in Classical Chinese grammar

See also 
 "Leere Worte" ("Empty Words"), a song by Böhse Onkelz from Viva los tioz